Lady Magnesia (Russian: Леди Магнезия, Ledi Magneziya, Op. 112) is a 1975 comic opera by Mieczysław Weinberg to his own Russian libretto after the 1905 play Passion, Poison and Petrifaction by George Bernard Shaw.

References

1975 operas
Compositions by Mieczysław Weinberg
Russian-language operas
Operas based on plays
Operas
Adaptations of works by George Bernard Shaw